This is a list of programs broadcast by the CTV Television Network and the CTV 2 television system in Canada. The list consists of television programs currently broadcast, programs formerly aired, and programs that are soon to be broadcast by the two Bell Media-owned networks. Former listings for CTV 2 include programs aired by the system under its former brands CTV Two, A, A-Channel, and NewNet.

Current programming

Original programming

Comedy series
Jann (2019)
Children Ruin Everything (2022)
Shelved (2023)

Drama series
Transplant (2020)
The Spencer Sisters (2023)

Reality/documentary series
The Amazing Race Canada (2013)

Talk shows
The Marilyn Denis Show (2011)
The Social (2013)

News programming
CTV Morning Live (2011)
CTV National News (1961)
etalk (1998)
Question Period (1967)
W5 (1966)
Your Morning (2016)

Canadian content reruns
 Canada's Worst Driver (CTV 2)
 Cash Cab (CTV)
 Corner Gas (CTV 2)
 Fear Thy Neighbor (CTV 2)
 Flashpoint (CTV 2)
 Heavy Rescue: 401 (CTV 2)
 Hellfire Heroes (CTV 2)
 Highway Thru Hell (CTV 2)
 Jade Fever (CTV 2)
 The Littlest Hobo (mid-1960s, 1979–1992, 1997–2000, 2005–2011, 2023) (both)
 Mary Makes It Easy (CTV)
 Mighty Cruise Ships (CTV 2)

American series

CTV 2

Upcoming programming
 True Lies (March 1, 2023)

Previously broadcast

CTV

Canadian TV series

5-4-3-2-Run (1988–1990)
19-2 (2017)
21c (news) (2001-2004)
Acorn the Nature Nut (1996–2007)
Act Fast 
The Alan Thicke Show (1980-1983)
Alice, I Think (reran on A-Channel)
At Home
The Amazing World of Kreskin
Anne of Green Gables: The Animated Series (2008–2011)
Anything You Can Do
The Associates (2001-2002)
Audubon Wildlife Theatre
Balance: Television for Living Well
The Barbara McNair Show
Bigshots (1995–1996)
Birdz (1999–2000)
Bizarre (1980-1985)
The Bobby Vinton Show (variety show)
The Bobroom (comedy)
Bonacini's Italy
Bordertown
Buddies (1967–1968)
A Bunch of Munsch (1991-1992)
The Camilla Scott Show (1995–1998 (BBS); 1998–2001)
The Campbells (1986–1991)
Canada AM (news/morning show) (1972-2016)
Canada's Worst Driver
Canada's Worst Handyman
Canadian Idol (game show/singing competition) (2003-2008)
The Capers
Cardinal (2017–21)
Carter (reruns)
Check it Out! (comedy) (1985-1988)
Circus
Circle Ranch
The City (drama) (1999-2000)
Cold Squad (1998-2005)
Corner Gas (2004-2009)
Counterstrike (1990–1993)
Dancing with the Stars
Dan for Mayor (sitcom) (2009-2010)
Definition (1974-1989)
Degrassi: The Next Generation (2001-2009)
The Detail (2018)
D'Myna Leagues (2000–2004)
DNA Dinners
Doctor's Diary
Don't Stop Now (1986–1988)
Double Exposure (comedy)
Due South
E.N.G. (1989–1994)
The Eleventh Hour (2002-2005)
Excuse My French (1974-1976)
Extra, Extra (1987–1990)
Fantastica (1973–1975)
FashionTelevision (2008-2012)
Flying Rhino Junior High (1999–2002)
Funny Farm (comedy) (1974-1975)
Funtown
F/X: The Series (1996–1998)
George (1972-1973)
Good Morning Canada (2000-2009)
Grand Old Country (variety show) (1975-1981)
Guess What (1983–1987)
He Knows, She Knows (1972-1983)
Headline Hunters (1970-1973)
Here Come the Seventies (1970-1973)
Hiccups (sitcom) (2010-2011)
Holmes Family Effect (2021)
The Holmes Show (2002-2003)
Holmes on Homes (reruns)
HOMEstyle (1995–1997)
Hootenanny
How It's Made (reruns)
Ian Tyson Show
I Do, Redo (2020)
The Indian Detective (2017; 2020)
Instant Star (2004-2005)
It's Your Move (game show) (1964-1967, 1974-1979)
John Allan Cameron (variety show)
Junior Talent Hour
Just for Laughs: All Access (also on CTV 2)
Kareen's Yoga
Katie and Orbie (1998–2000, 2003–2009)
Katts and Dog (1988-1993)
Kevin Spencer (Moved to The Comedy Network)
Kids@Discovery (2002–2011)
Kidstuff (1975–1979)
Kingdom Adventure (1997–2011)
A Kin to Win (1961-1964)
Leaps and Bounds (1998–2001, 2004–2005)
Learning the Ropes
Let's Go (1976–1987)
The Listener (2009-2014)
Live It Up! (1978–1990)
MacLear
The Mad Dash (1978–1981)
Magistrates Court
Mantrap
Marc's Music Shop (1970–1971)
Mary's Kitchen Crush
MasterChef Canada (2014–21)
Motive (2013–2016; 2020 (CTV 2))
Mount Royal (1988)
My Kind of Town (variety show)
My Secret Identity (1988–1995)
Mysterious Ways (2000-2002)
Neon Rider (drama) (1990-1992)
The New Avengers (1977)
Night Heat (1985–1989)
Once a Thief (1997–1998)
Open Mike with Mike Bullard (1997-2003)
Outdoor Sportsman
OWL/TV (1990–1994)
The Patsy Gallant Show
Paul Hann and Friends (1985–1988)
Pay Cards!
People in Conflict (1962-1970)
Perry's Probe (investigative journalism)
Pierre Berton Hour
Pig 'N' Whistle (1967–1977)
Played (2013)
Poetree and Friends (1995–2000)
Police Surgeon (1972-1974)
Pop Life
Power Play (1998-2000)
Puppet People (1971–1973)
Puttnam's Prairie Emporium (1988–1990)
The Red Fisher Show (1968-1969)
RoadCrew (1996–1998 (BBS); 1998–2000)
Robson Arms (2005–2008 (CTV); reran on CTV Two)
The Rockets (1987–1992)
Rocket Robin Hood
Romper Room
The Roy Jewell Farm Show 
The Sausage Factory (2002)
Saving Hope  (2012-2017)
Search and Rescue
Secret Lives
Shirley (1989–1995)
Snow Job (1983-1985)
So You Think You Can Dance Canada (game show/dance competition) (2008-2011)
Spider-Man
SportsCentre (2007–2020)
Spun Out (2014-2015)
The Starlost (1973-1974)
Stars on Ice (1976-1981)
Story Theatre (1971–1975)
Storytime (1981–1985)
Super Pay Cards (1981-1982)
Swiss Family Robinson (1974-1975)
Take Your Choice 
Target: The Impossible (1973-1974)
Telepoll (1961-1965)
Ten is Five
This Is Pop (2021)
Thrill of a Lifetime (reality) (1981-1987)
To Tell the Truth (game show) (1962-1964)
Travel Magazine
Travel, Travel!
The Tree House
The Trouble with Tracy (1970-1971)
Twice in a Lifetime (1999–2001)
The Ultimate Love Test (reality)
Uncle Bobby (1968–1970)
University of the Air (1966-1983)
Untamed World (1968–1976, 1978–1985)
Valerie Pringle Has Left The Building (2002-2006)
Waterville Gang (1972–1973)
Whatever Turns You On (1979–1980)
What's My Line? (1978-1980)
What's the Good Word?
Whister (2006–2008 (CTV); reran on A)
Wide World of Sports (sports anthology)
Wingding
Wonder Why? (1990–2001)
You Can't Do That on Television (1982–1985)
You Really Can
Zig Zag

American TV series

101 Ways to Leave a Game Show
8 Simple Rules (sitcom)
Access Hollywood
According to Jim (sitcom)
Adam-12
All Rise (2019–21)
Archer
American Housewife (2016–2019, 2020–21 (CTV); 2019 (CTV 2))
American Idol
Disney's Adventures of the Gummi Bears (1989–1990)
Marvel's Agents of S.H.I.E.L.D. (2013–2020)
Alias (drama)
Alice
Ally McBeal (1997-2002)
Almost Family (2019–20)
America's Funniest People (1990–1995)
Anderson Live (talk show)
Andy Barker, P.I.
The Andy Griffith Show
Animal World
Another World (1970–1999)
Anything But Love
Arrow
@midnight
Awkwafina is Nora from Queens
Barnaby Jones
Batfink (1967–1968)
Batman
Battlestar Galactica
Baywatch (1990)
Beat the Clock
The Beatles (1966–1968)
Benson
Best of the West
Bethenny (talk show)
Bewitched (1964–1972)
Big Shots
The Bionic Woman
Blansky's Beauties
Blindspot (2015–2020)
The Bob Newhart Show
The Bold and The Beautiful
Bob Patterson (2001)
B Positive (2020–22)
The Brady Bunch (1971–1974)
Bridget Loves Bernie
Broad City
Buck Rogers in the 25th Century
The Carol Burnett Show (1969–1971)
Catfish: The TV Show (previously also on CTV 2)
Charlie's Angels
The Charlie Horse Music Pizza (1998–1999)
Charmed (1998–2000, 2002–2004)
Cheers (1984–1993)
City (1990)
Close to Home (2005–2007)
Code Black (2015–2018)
Columbo
Comedy Central Stand-Up Presents
Commander-in-Chief (political drama)
Conan (2010–2021)
The Cosby Show (1985–1992)
The Courtship of Eddie's Father
Criminal Minds: Beyond Borders (2016–2017)
Criminal Minds: Suspect Behavior (2011)
CSI: Crime Scene Investigation (2000–2015)
CSI: Cyber (2015–2016)
CSI: Miami (2002–2012)
CSI: NY (2004–2013)
Cybill
Damon (1998)
Dan August
Daddio (2000; season 2)
Delvecchio
Desperate Housewives (2004–2012)
Dexter
A Different World (1987–1993)
Diff'rent Strokes
Dirty Sexy Money (CTV and CTV Two)
Disney's One Saturday Morning (1997–1998 (BBS); 1998–2002)
Donny and Marie (1976–1979)
The Dr. Oz Show (2009–22) (also on CTV 2)
Dr. Quinn, Medicine Woman (1993–1995, 1998; 1995–1998 (BBS))
Dr. Vegas (2004)
The Drew Carey Show (1995–1998 (BBS); 1998–2004)
Drive (drama)
The Dukes of Hazzard
Ellen (previously on BBS; 1998)
 The Ellen DeGeneres Show (2004–2022 (CTV 2); 2011–2022 (CTV))
Ellen's Game of Games (2017–21)
Emergence (2019–2020)
Emergency!
ER (1994–2009)
The Everly Brothers Show (1970)
The F.B.I.
Falcon Crest
The Fall Guy
Family Affair
Family Matters (1990–1993)
Felicity (1998–2000)
Filthy Rich (2020–21)
Fish
The Flash
For Life (2020–21)
For Love or Money (reality)
For Your Love (1998)
Game of Thrones
GCB (2012)
The Geena Davis Show (2000–2001)
Gemini Man
General Hospital
Getting Personal (1998)
Ghost Whisperer (2005–2007)
Gilligan's Island
God Friended Me (2018–2020)
Good Times
Grand Hotel (2019)
The Greatest American Hero
Grimm (2011–2017)
Growing Pains
Happy Hour
Hardcastle and McCormick
The Hardy Boys/Nancy Drew Mysteries
Harry O
Hart to Hart (1979–1984)
Here's Lucy
Home Economics (2021–22)
Home Improvement (1998–1999)
Hope & Faith (sitcom)
Hotel
How to Get Away with Murder (2014–2020)
Hudson Street (1995–1996)
Human Target
I Dream of Jeannie (1966–1970)
The Invisible Man
Ironside
Intelligence (2014)
It's a Living
The Jackie Thomas Show (1992–1993)
Jake and the Fatman
Jeannie
Jericho (drama)
Jersey Shore: Family Vacation
Joan of Arcadia (comedy/drama)
Joe Forrester
Kaz
Knots Landing
Kojak
Kung Fu (1973–1975)
Kung Fu: The Legend ContinuesL.A.'s Finest (2019–21)Lanigan's RabbiLaw & Order (1990–1996, 1998–2010; 1996–1998 (BBS))Law & Order: Criminal IntentLaw & Order: Trial by Jury (legal drama)Law & Order: Special Victims Unit (1999-2021)The Lawrence Welk ShowLeave It to BeaverLegends of TomorrowLess Than Perfect (sitcom)Life on a Stick (sitcom)Life with Bonnie (sitcom)The Lone Ranger (1966–1967)Lonesome Dove: The Series (1994–1996)LongstreetLove in the Wild (2011–2012)Lucifer (2016–2018)Mad About You (reruns) (2021–2022)Mad MenMagnum, P.I. (1980–1988)Magnum P.I. (2018 TV series) (2018–22)Man From AtlantisMannixMarcus Welby, M.D.The Masked Dancer (2020–21)Match Game (2016–21)MatlockMatt HoustonMcCloudMcMillan & WifeMelrose Place (previously on BBS; 1998–1999)Medical Investigation (2004–2005)The Michael Richards Show (2000)The Mentalist (2008–2009 (A), 2009–2015 (CTV))Miami ViceThe Mighty Jungle (1996–1998)The Millers (2014–2015)Missing (2012)The Mod SquadModels Inc. (1994–1995)The Mole (reality)MoonlightingMurphy Brown (1988–1998)The Mysteries of Laura (2014–2016)The Naked Truth (1995–1996 (BBS); 1997–1998)The New Adventures of Winnie the Pooh (1989–1991)Newlyweds: Nick and Jessica (reality)Night Court (1984–1989)The Nine (drama)Nip/Tuck (drama)No Ordinary Family (crime drama)The Norm ShowNYPD Blue (1993–1994)The O.C. (drama)October Road (drama) (Season 1 did not air in Canada)On Our Own (1994–1995)One Day at a Time (sitcom)One Ocean View (reality)Operation PetticoatThe Oprah Winfrey Show (previously on BBS; 1998–2011)The Osbournes (reality)People's Choice Awards (1979–2005)PetrocelliPicket FencesPimp My Ride (reality)Pivoting (2022)Planet of the ApesPolice WomanPolitically Incorrect (1998–1999)Project UFOPromised Land (1997–1998)Punk'd (2003–2004)Queens (2021–22)Quincy, M.E.Rebel (2021)The Red Line (2019)Rescue 911 (docudrama)Resurrection (2014–2015)RidiculousnessThe Robert Guillaume Show (1989)The Rockford Files (1976–1979)Rocky & His FriendsThe RookiesRoom for Two (1992–1993)Roseanne (1988–1997)Roswell (1999–2000)Rowan & Martin's Laugh-In (1968–1969)Salvage 1Sanford and SonScarecrow and Mrs. KingScrubs (sitcom) (2001-2008)The Simple Life (reality)The Simple Life 2: Road Trip (reality)The Simple Life 3: Interns (reality)The Sinbad Show (1993–1994)Siskel & Ebert & the Movies (previously on BBS; 1998–1999)The Six Million Dollar ManSmithSomersetThe Sonny & Cher ShowThe Sopranos (drama)So You Think You Can Dance (2005–2015)Soul ManSoul TrainSouthland (2009)South Park (2020)Space Ghost (1966–1967)Spenser: For HireSpin City (1996–2000)Sports NightStar TrekStar Wars: The Clone Wars (2008–2009)The Streets of San FranciscoStudio 60 on the Sunset Strip (drama)Stumptown (2019–20)Suddenly Susan (1999–2000)Supermarket Sweep (2020–22)The SurvivorsSwitchTarzánTattingers (1988–1989)Temperatures RisingTexasThat '80s Show (sitcom)Third Watch (1999–2005)This Is Us (2016–22)Tommy Lee Goes to College (reality)Truth or ConsequencesTwo and a Half Men (2007–2012 (CTV Two); 2012–2015 (CTV))Twenty Good YearsUnforgettable (2011–2014, 2020; 2014 (CTV Two))Ultimate Tag (2020)Unsolved Mysteries (1990–1997)Vega$Veronica's Closet (1997–2000)Veronica Mars (drama)The Waltons (1976–1979)Watching Ellie (2002–2003)Weakest LinkWelcome to The Captain (comedy)The West Wing (1999–2005)What About Joan? (2001)WhitneyWhose Line Is it Anyway?Without a Trace (2007-2009)Wonder WomanWorld of Dance (2017–20; 2018–19 (CTV 2))WorkaholicsThe X Factor (2011–2013)Zoey's Extraordinary Playlist (2020–21)

Foreign TV seriesBrat Camp (reality) Department S (1969–1970)The Prisoner (1967)Randall and Hopkirk (Deceased)The Real Dirty Dancing (2022)The Secret Service (1970–1971)Spyforce (1973–1975)Supernanny (reality)The SweeneyUFOThe Unusual Suspects (2022)World Idol (international game show)

CTV 2
Canadian TV seriesA Morning A News Breakfast Television (1995–2008)Careers TV (2000–2009)Charlie Jade (2005–2007)CityLine (1995–2008)Collar of Duty (2022)Daily PlanetDotto's Data Cafe (2003–2005)Dotto Tech (2003–2009)Dr. Keri: Prairie VetThe Electric Playground (1999–2007)Jeff Ltd. (2006–2007 (CTV); 2007–2008)Missing (2003–2009)Mud Mountain HaulersRelic Hunter (2006–2009)Reviews on the Run (2003–2007)Road to Avonlea (2008-2011)Rookie Blue (reruns)Spencer's Big 30Vintage Tech HuntersAmerican TV series7th Heaven (2001–2007)30 Rock (2006–2007 (CTV); 2007–2008)Alex, Inc. (2018)All My Children (1998–2011)America's Funniest Home Videos (1990–1997 (CTV); 2002–2009)America's Got Talent: Extreme (2022)America's Most Wanted (1997–2000 (CTV); 2000–2006)America's Next Top Model (2004–2013)Anger Management (2012–2013 (CTV); 2013–2019)Babylon 5 (1995–1997)Baywatch Nights (1995–1997)Big Bad BeetleborgsThe Big Leap (2021–22)Buffy the Vampire Slayer (1997–2003)The Burning Zone (1996–1997)Castle (2009–2016, 2019; 2010–2016 (CTV))Cleopatra 2525 (2000–2001)Comedy Now! (reruns)COPS (1997–1999 (CTV); 2000–2006)The Crow: Stairway to Heaven (1998–1999)Dateline (1994-1999 (CTV); 2010–2016)Daytime Divas (2019)Dirty Sexy Money (2007 (CTV); 2007–2009)Donny & Marie (1998–1999)Don't Forget the Lyrics! (2007–2009)Eleventh Hour (2008–2009)Eli Stone (2008–2009)Families of the MafiaFashion Star (2012–2013)Floribama Shore (reruns)Goode Behavior (1996–1997)Gossip Girl (2007–2008 (CTV); 2008–2010)Gotham (2014–2017 (CTV); 2017–2019)The Hills (reruns)The Hills: New Beginnings (2020–2022)Homeboys in Outer Space (1996–1997)Hope & Faith (2005–2006)Hot in Cleveland (2010–2020)Jack of All Trades (2000)Jeopardy! (previously on BBS; 1998–2008 (CTV); 2008)Jericho (2006–2008)The Kids Are Alright (2018–2019 (CTV); 2019)Kyle XY (2007–2008)Late Night with Conan O'Brien (1995–2009)Late Night with Jimmy Fallon (2009–2014)Love Boat: The Next Wave (1998–1999)Mad Men (2008–2009)Martin (1995–1997)Medium (2005–2008 (CTV); 2009–2011)Messyness (2022)Miami Medical (2010)Mighty Trains (reruns)Mike & Molly (2010–21)Monk (2002–2008)Nikita (2010–2013)Once Upon a Time (2011–2017 (CTV); 2017–2018)One Life to Live (2002–2009)Our Kind of People (2021–22)Outmatched (2020)Pandora (2020)Primetime (2003–2006)The Protector (2011)Pushing Daisies (2008–2009)Reno 911! (reruns)Samantha Who? (2007–2009)The Sentinel (1996–1999)Skysurfer Strike Force (1995–1997)Siesta KeySmallville (2005–2008)Stargate Atlantis (2009–2010)Stargate SG-1 (2007–2009)Stargate Universe (2010–2011)Star Trek: Voyager (1995–2004)Summerland (2004–2005)Supernanny (2005–2008)Temptation IslandTerminator: The Sarah Connor ChroniclesThe Tonight Show with Jay Leno (1995–2009, 2010–2014)Tosh.0Touched by an Angel (1997–2007)Undercover Boss (2010–2012 (CTV); 2013)Unforgettable (2011–2014 (CTV), 2014)Up All Night (2011–2012)The Vampire Diaries (2009–2010 (CTV); 2010–2017)Wheel of Fortune (previously on BBS; 1998–2003 (CTV); 2007–2008)Who Wants to Be a Millionaire (1999–2002 (CTV); 2002–2009)Wife Swap (2008–2009)WWF Monday Night Raw (reruns only; 1993–1998)YoungerYour Face or Mine? (2022)

BBSAll-American Girl (1994–1995)101 Dalmatians: The Series (1997–1998)Bone Chillers (1996–1997)Boy Meets World (1993–1998)Brand Spankin' New! DougChicago Sons (1997)Cosby (1996–1997)DuckTales (reruns; 1997)Family Album (1993)It Had to Be You (1993)GargoylesHardball (1994)Joe's Life (1993)Jungle CubsLife's Work (1996–1997)Men Behaving Badly (1996–1997)The Mighty DucksNightmare Ned (1997)Quack PackRecessThe Smurfs (reruns)The Lion King's Timon and PumbaaToronto Blue Jays AL baseball (1992–1996)Townies (1996)The Trouble with Larry (1993)Under Suspicion (1994–1995)X-MenAccess/CTV 2 AlbertaAcorn the Nature Nut (1995–2005)The Addams Family (1998–2001)Adventures in Rainbow Country (January 1986–December 1988)The Adventures of Bee Alert Bert (1999–2002)Adventures of Dudley the Dragon (1993–2008)Alive! (1995–2000)Ants in Your Pants (2001–2004)ArthurBabar (2001–2004)BaliBarney Miller (1998–2000)Beezoo's Attic (1999–2002)The Big Comfy Couch (1995–2000)Bobby's World (2000–2001)The Body Works (1980–1991)Bookmice (1995–1999)Boris Brott and Those Magnificent Music Machines (1985–1988)The Bush Baby (1993–1997)CG KidsCNET Central (1997)Computer Chronicles (1996–1999)CorduroyDave Chalk's Computer Show (1997)DeafplanetDestinos (1993–2011)Dino DanDoctor Snuggles (1985–1991)Dotto's Data Cafe (1996–2004)Down to EarthElliot Moose (1999–2003)Eric's World (1992–1998)Family FeudFinding Stuff OutThe Friendly GiantF.R.O.GGeorge ShrinksGet Outta TownGreen Acres (1998–2000)Groundling Marsh (1996–2009)Harriet's Magic Hats (1980–1997)The Hoobs (2002–2006)Igloo GlooInquiring Minds (1995–2000)Iris the Happy ProfessorJakers! The Adventures of Piggley WinksJoin In! (1990–1995)The Jungle Room (2007–2013)Kid's Planet Video (1998–2001)Kimba the White Lion (2001–2005)Kitty Cats (1992–1997)The Koala BrothersLift Off (1993–1997)Little Bear (2001–2005)Little Star (2000–2005)L&J News (1996–2000)The Magic Box (2001–2005)The Magic Library (1990–1999)The Magic School Bus (2002–2004)Making StuffMath Factor (1995–2015)The MAXimum Dimension (2000–2002)Mighty Machines (2004–2012)Miss BGMustard Pancakes (2005–2009)Namaste (2005–2013)The New Explorers (1995–1999)Noddy (1985–1987)Noonbory and the Super 7 (2009–2011)The Ocean Room (2010–2014)Open Book (2001–2005)Panda Bear Daycare (2000–2003)Parlez-moi (1979–1995)Peep and the Big Wide World (2004–2008)Pictionary (1997–1998)Planet EchoPolka Dot Door (1973–1999)Pop It!The Prime Radicals (2012)Readalong (1976–1991)Renegadepress.comReturn to the Magic Library (1991–1999)Ricky's Room (2002–2006)Rob the Robot (2012)Rockabye Bubble (2000–2003)Roger's New Reality (1999–2002)Room for FiveRuffus the Dog (2000–2003)Sagwa, the Chinese Siamese Cat (2003–2007)Science Alive (1992–2000)Sex Wars (2000–2002)Shimmy (2007–2012)Spilled Milk (2001–2003)Spin City (2002–2003)Star Trek: Deep Space Nine (2004–2005)Survey of Western Art (1994–2000)System Crash (2009–2011)Taste Buds (2008–2015)Think Big (2009–2012)This is Daniel CookThis is Turtle Island (2003–2004)Timothy Goes to SchoolTurtle Island (2002–2005)Today's Special (January 13, 1986 – 1996)To Tell the Truth (2000–2002)The Toy Castle (2001–2011)Troupers (1993–1995)Wakanheja (2004–2005)Walter Melon (1998–2001)Where on Earth Is Carmen Sandiego? (1998–2001)Who Wants to Be a MillionaireWimzie's House (2006–2011)Wishbone (1996–1999)Wonder Why? (1992–1999)Written in Canada (2005–2007)ZoboomafooASN
Canadian series20 Minute Workout100 Huntley StreetAcorn the Nature NutAdderlyAdventures in Rainbow CountryAfrican SkiesThe Amazing World of KreskinBabarBits and BytesBookmiceBreakfast TelevisionThe Camilla Scott ShowCanadian Football League (1987–1990)Care BearsCitylineThe Crow: Stairway to HeavenEarth: Final ConflictEd's Night PartyFashionTelevisionFighting WordsFirst WaveJackpotKatts & DogLandscape of GeometryMediaTelevisionMicro MagicMovieTelevisionMy Pet MonsterN3tvNeon RiderOopsy DaisyPolka Dot DoorProfessor Moffett's Science WorkshopRags to RichesRay Bradbury TheaterThe Red Fisher ShowThe Science AllianceSize SmallToday's SpecialTree HouseUniversity of the AirVicki GabereauVid KidsYou Can't Do That on TelevisionZig ZagAmerican seriesAll My Children (1998-2011)America's Funniest Home VideosBatman: The Animated SeriesBeetleborgs MetallixBlind DateBlossomThe Bob Newhart ShowBravestarrBreaker HighBuffy the Vampire SlayerCarol Burnett and FriendsChallenge of the GoBotsCheers (reruns)COPSCounterstrikeA Country PracticeDempsey and MakepeaceThe Disney Afternoon/Disney-Kellogg AllianceDisney's DougDuckTalesFameFamily FeudFamily Ties (reruns)The FlintstonesFraggle RockFriends (reruns)Goof TroopGuiding LightHead of the ClassHighlander: The SeriesHome ImprovementHouse CallsThe Howie Mandel ShowJemJeopardy! (1991–2008)KidsworldKung FuLive with Regis & KellyMauryMelrose PlaceThe New Candid CameraNew YouNight Court (reruns)The Oprah Winfrey ShowOutlawsThe People's CourtPerfect StrangersPower Rangers in SpacePower Rangers Power PlaybackRobotechSailor MoonSanta BarbaraScooby-DooSeinfeld (reruns)Smurfs AdventuresSpin CityThe Shnookums and Meat Funny Cartoon ShowSupermarket SweepStar Trek: The Next GenerationStar Trek: VoyagerTeenage Mutant Ninja TurtlesThat's LifeThrobTimon & PumbaaTiny Toon AdventuresThe Tonight Show with Jay LenoTouched by an AngelThe TransformersThe ViewV.I.P.Wheel of Fortune (1991–2008)Whose Line Is It Anyway?The Wonderful World of DisneyWKRP in CincinnatiWWF Superstars''

See also
CTV Television Network
CTV 2
List of Canadian television series
List of Canadian television channels

Notes

References

External links
CTV/CTV 2

CTV